An aluminum  bottle is a bottle made of aluminum (or aluminium, in British English). It is a bottle made entirely of aluminium that holds beer, soft drinks, wine, and other liquids.

History and overview 
The aluminium beverage bottle made via the impact extrusion process was introduced to the North American beverage market in the fall of 2001 as an ecological alternative to plastic bottles by Coca-Cola under the Powerade brand (Psych and Raize) at the National Association of Convenience Stores NACS Show. The Powerade aluminium bottles were supplied by Exal Corporation. Youngstown, Ohio-based Exal Corporation, the world's largest producer of impact-extruded aluminium packaging, is the most significant supplier of aluminium bottles in North America and Europe including most bottles utilized by major brewers. The company also markets a new high speed technology, known as Coil to Can or (C2C), that allows for the manufacture of aluminium bottles at weights 30–40% below the weight of impact extruded bottles at 2 to 4 times the manufacturing speed. C2C technology also utilizes post consumer recycled (PCR) aluminium alloy to manufacture aluminium bottles. Hermitage, PA-based CCL Container a subsidiary of CCL Industries, a leading producer of recyclable aluminium bottles, packaging, aerosol containers and other specialty products, started developing bottles in 1989, in North America for non-beverage applications.

Characteristics and advantages 
The aluminium bottlecan is made of 100 percent recyclable aluminium similar to that of an aluminium beverage can. However, it is shaped similar to a traditional beverage bottle, with many designs including resealable lids. A broad range of aluminium beverage bottle profiles, styles, and configurations, are available for commercial production, including “traditional”, “oval”, and “sport shapes”.

A variety of standard finishes are available for aluminium bottlecans that are designed to work with industry standard closures and caps, in addition to standard bottle filling operations. Some traditional finishes include: 26 mm standard crown cap, 38 mm lug finish, 38 mm continuous thread with plastic sleeve, 38 mm ROPP and 28 mm continuous thread finishes.

Beverage marketers choose aluminium bottlecans for many reasons, including the fact that they are resealable, recyclable and durable. The bottle itself serves as the label and bottles can also be shaped in a variety of ways.

“Cooler longer” claim 
A study conducted by engineering science students at Loyola College in Maryland suggested that the liquid content of aluminium bottles stays slightly colder than the liquid content of glass bottles when allowed to warm at room temperature.  These results were not corroborated by a 2005 study at Bucknell University, which found that “the fluid in the aluminium bottle cools much faster than the glass bottle, and once removed from a cold source and exposed to room temperature, the glass bottle remained cooler longer than the aluminium bottle.”  This conclusion is consistent with the fact that the bulk thermal conductivity of aluminium (237 W/(m·K)) is significantly higher than that of glass (1.1 W/(m·K)), as well as the fact that aluminium bottles are significantly thinner than glass.

Fabrication 
Aluminium Bottlecans are typically made through either an impact extrusion or deep drawing process, followed by additional necking and thread forming steps.

See also
 List of bottle types, brands and companies

References

External links

 Photos of aluminium bottles
 The rise of aluminium drink bottles
 How to wash your aluminium protein bottles
 aluminium metal protein shaker bottles

Bottle
Bottles
American inventions
Aluminum objects